The following lists events that happened during 1872 in New Zealand.

Incumbents

Regal and viceregal
Head of State — Queen Victoria
Governor — Sir George Ferguson Bowen

Government and law
The 5th New Zealand Parliament continues.

Speaker of the House — Sir Francis Dillon Bell
Premier — On 11 October George Waterhouse replaces Edward Stafford after the latter loses a vote of confidence. Stafford had only been in office for 1 month having taken over when William Fox was forced to resign on 10 September.
Minister of Finance — Julius Vogel loses his position on 10 September when the Fox ministry is forced to resign and is replaced by Thomas Gillies. Vogel regains the post on 11 October after he moves a vote of no confidence in the new ministry.
Chief Justice — Hon Sir George Arney

Main centre leaders
Mayor of Auckland — Philip Philips
Mayor of Christchurch — James Jameson followed by Henry Sawtell
Mayor of Dunedin — Henry Fish
Mayor of Wellington — Joseph Dransfield

Events 
 Vaccination of babies against smallpox made compulsory by the Public Health Act 1872 
2 May: The Waikato Times and Thames Valley Gazette begins publishing in Ngāruawāhia. Initially it was produced three times a week. It moved to Hamilton in 1875 and became the Waikato Times. The paper, a daily since the late 19th century, continues to publish .
4 September: The Bay of Plenty Times publishes its first issue. The Tauranga-based newspaper continues to publish .
5 October: The Poverty Bay Standard begins publishing as a weekly newspaper in the Gisborne area. It increased its frequency over the next two years to become tri-weekly. It was later called the Gisborne Standard.

Sport

Athletics
The first recorded amateur athletic meeting takes place, in Christchurch.

Golf
The first golf club in New Zealand is formed in Otago to play on a 9-hole course at Mornington, Dunedin.

Horse racing

Major race winners
New Zealand Cup winner – Detractor
New Zealand Derby winner – Culumny

Lawn bowls
The Dunedin Bowling and Quoiting Club opens its own green.

Rugby union
 20 July: Wanganui Rugby Club founded.

Shooting
Ballinger Belt — Captain Wales (Otago)

Births
 22 February: Frank Worsley, sea captain and explorer.
 21 June: Winter Hall, silent movie actor.
 18 November: Frederick Augustus Bennett, first Bishop of Aotearoa.

Deaths
 27 July: Richard Packer, politician.
 11 August: Richard Cantrell, politician.

See also
List of years in New Zealand
Timeline of New Zealand history
History of New Zealand
Military history of New Zealand
Timeline of the New Zealand environment
Timeline of New Zealand's links with Antarctica

References
General
 Romanos, J. (2001) New Zealand Sporting Records and Lists. Auckland: Hodder Moa Beckett. 
Specific

External links